I Love the '80s Strikes Back is a miniseries and the third installment of the I Love the... series on VH1 in which various music and TV personalities reminisce about 1980s popular culture in a mostly humorous manner. The series premiered on October 20, 2003, and is a sequel to I Love the '80s.

The sequel designation is in the reference to The Empire Strikes Back.

Commentators

Carol Alt
John Amos
Curtis Armstrong
Rosanna Arquette
Ashanti
The B-52's (Fred Schneider and Cindy Wilson)
Sebastian Bach
The Bangles (Susanna Hoffs and Vicki Peterson) 
Barenaked Ladies
Greg Behrendt
Anna Belknap
Jellybean Benitez
D.C. Benny
Frank Black
Michael Ian Black
The Black Eyed Peas (Taboo, Fergie, apl.de.ap and will.i.am)
Lesley Boone
Bozo the Clown
Candace Cameron Bure
Brooke Burke
Bill Burr
Timothy Busfield
Bryan Callen
Mariah Carey
Cedric the Entertainer
Ellen Cleghorne
George Clinton
Mo Collins
Stewart Copeland
David Coverdale
Jon Cryer
Molly Culver
Dido
Rocco DiSpirito
Simon Doonan
The Donnas (Brett Anderson, Allison Robertson, Maya Ford and Torry Castellano)
Howie Dorough
Bil Dwyer
Rich Eisen
Corey Feldman
Colin Ferguson
Craig Ferguson
Mark Feuerstein
Flavor Flav
Lita Ford
Samantha Fox
Doug E. Fresh
John Fugelsang
Zach Galligan
Boy George
Debbie Gibson
Godfrey
Tracey Gold
Gilbert Gottfried
Kathy Griffin
Luis Guzman
Hall & Oates
Hanson
Rachael Harris
Jay Harrington
Steve Harwell
Colin Hay
Jason Hervey
Leslie Hope
Finola Hughes
Scott Ian
Jane's Addiction (Perry Farrell, Chris Chaney, Steve Perkins and Dave Navarro)
Stephan Jenkins
Chris Jericho
Betsey Johnson
Cherie Johnson
Cris Judd
Nick Lachey
Queen Latifah
Cyndi Lauper
Robin Leach
Juliette Lewis
Beth Littleford
Donal Logue
Loni Love
Rob Lowe
Carl Lumbly
Stephen Lynch
MC Lyte
Virginia Madsen
Joe Mantegna
Maroon 5 (Adam Levine and James Valentine)
John Mayer
Darryl McDaniels
Tim McGraw
Mark McGrath
Breckin Meyer
Penelope Ann Miller
Monica
Mandy Moore
Tom Morello
Vince Neil
John Ondrasik
Patton Oswalt
Jenna Von Oy
Paula Jai Parker
Vincent Pastore
Liz Phair
Kate Pierson
Bronson Pinchot
Pink
Stefanie Powers
Lindsay Price
Danny Provenzano
Rachel Quaintance
Donnell Rawlings
Mary Lou Retton
Mo Rocca
Henry Rollins
David Lee Roth
Darius Rucker
Richie Sambora
Emma Samms
Mary Scheer
Ricky Schroder
Dennis Seaton
Charlie Sheen
Sheila E.
Pauly Shore
Dee Snider
Rena Sofer
Hal Sparks
Frank Stallone
Joel Stein
Rob Thomas
Lea Thompson
Triumph the Insult Comic Dog
Brian Unger
Usher
Joan Van Ark
Frank Vincent
Gedde Watanabe
Jody Watley
Ashley Williams
Chuck Woolery
Adrian Young
Young MC
Adrian Zmed
Rob Zombie

Recurring segments
 Donal Logue's Unfinished Thoughts: Donal Logue gives an unfinished thought on a pop culture event from each year.
 Break Up Songs: Boy George presents the breakup songs for each year.
 Hip-Hop Jam: Doug E. Fresh presents the hip-hop jam for each year.
 Public Service Announcement: A public service announcement from each year is presented.
 Nerds: Gedde Watanabe presents the nerds for each year.
 What the F#?%!!! Moment: Gilbert Gottfried presents the "What the F#?%!!!" moment (i.e., blunder) for each year.
 During the credits of every episode, a clip from a popular music video was played without any type of commentary. These were usually replaced with a show promo by VH1.

Topics covered by year

1980
 American Gigolo
 Too Close for Comfort
 "Whip It" by Devo
 Richie Rich
 Grey Poupon
 Superman II
 The Plastic Man Comedy/Adventure Show
 Flash Gordon
 "Rock with You" by Michael Jackson
 Real People
 The Blues Brothers
 Eight Is Enough 
 Solid Gold
 Satin jackets
 Stir Crazy
 Private Benjamin
 Alice 
 Friendship bracelets and ribbon barrettes
 "I Want You To Want Me" by Cheap Trick
 Hungry Hungry Hippos 
 Friday the 13th

Break Up Songs of 1980: "Boys Don't Cry" by The Cure, "Please Don't Go" by KC and the Sunshine Band and "You've Lost That Lovin' Feelin" by Hall & Oates

Donal Logue's Unfinished Thoughts on Superman

Hip-Hop Jam of 1980: "Rapper's Delight" by The Sugarhill Gang

PSA of 1980: The Bod Squad's "Don't Drown Your Food" PSA (healthy eating)

Nerds of 1980: Steve Jobs, Elvis Costello and C-3PO

The What The F#?%!!! Moment of 1980: Alvin and the Chipmunks release an album called Chipmunk Punk

1981
Dynasty
Smurfs
Journey's Escape album
On Golden Pond
"The Stroke" by Billy Squier
Endless Love
Magnum, P.I. 
"Super Freak" by Rick James
Iron-on decals
The Fall Guy
The Rolling Stones' Tattoo You Tour
Fernando Valenzuela
Hart to Hart 
Benetton
Benson 
Ronald Reagan likes Jelly Belly
Jelly shoes
Clash of the Titans
Simon and Garfunkel's concert in Central Park
Mommie Dearest

Donal Logue's Unfinished Thoughts on Journey

Break Up Songs of 1981: "Since You're Gone" by The Cars, "Don't You Want Me" by The Human League and "The Breakup Song (They Don't Write 'Em)" by The Greg Kihn Band

Hip-Hop Jam of 1981: "The Breaks" by Kurtis Blow

PSA of 1981: Think Before You Drink (Anti-Drinking Ad starring Brooke Shields)

Nerds of 1981: Prince Charles, Ric Ocasek and Bill Gates

The What The F#?%!!! Moment of 1981: The USDA proposes to cut school lunch programs by classifying ketchup as a school lunch vegetable

1982
Fame
Annie
"Abracadabra" by Steve Miller Band
Tootsie
ColecoVision
John Mellencamp
Wayne Gretzky
"Gloria" by Laura Branigan
The Toy
Conan the Barbarian and The Beastmaster
Men at Work
KangaROOS 
Mad Max 2: The Road Warrior
T. J. Hooker
"I'm So Excited" by The Pointer Sisters
An Officer and a Gentleman
G.I. Joe: A Real American Hero 
"Pass the Dutchie" by Musical Youth
Pink Floyd – The Wall
Star Trek II: The Wrath of Khan

Break Up Songs of 1982: "Do You Really Want to Hurt Me" by Culture Club, "Only Time Will Tell" by Asia and "Harden My Heart" by Quarterflash

PSA of 1982: Alternate Escape Routes in case of a fire ("Learn not to burn") Starring Dick Van Dyke

Hip-Hop Jam of 1982: "Planet Rock" by Afrika Bambaataa & the Soulsonic Force

Donal Logue's Unfinished Thoughts on The Beastmaster

Nerds of 1982: Thomas Dolby, Irwin "Skippy" Handelman and Sarah Jessica Parker

The What The F#?%!!! Moment of 1982: Yale University offers a 14-week course on mastering the Rubik's Cube

1983
Richard Simmons
"All Night Long (All Night)" by Lionel Richie
Staying Alive
Klondike bar
The Thorn Birds
Risky Business
Sunglasses
The Day After
The Outsiders
Cujo and Christine
Snausages (dog treats)
Chicken McNuggets 
"Rock This Town" by Stray Cats
Donkey Kong
Culture Club
Yentl
KISS takes off their makeup
Martina Navratilova
Fraggle Rock
V

Break Up Songs of 1983: "Total Eclipse of the Heart" by Bonnie Tyler, "Separate Ways (Worlds Apart)" by Journey and "Always Something There to Remind Me" by Naked Eyes

PSA of 1983: "We're not candy!" (about kids finding pills out of the bottle and accidentally eating them) by The Poison Control Center

Hip-Hop Jam of 1983: "White Lines (Don't Don't Do It)" by Grandmaster Melle Mel

Donal Logue's Unfinished Thoughts on The Day After and Snausages

Nerds of 1983: Nerds Candy, LeVar Burton and Simon Seville

The What The F#?%!!! Moment of 1983: The Beach Boys are banned from playing a July 4th celebration at the National Mall

1984
The Karate Kid
Van Halen's 1984 album
The wave
"Drive" by The Cars
Beverly Hills Cop
Cagney & Lacey
Menudo
Scratch and sniff and Trapper Keeper
A Nightmare on Elm Street
Thompson Twins
My Little Pony and Glo Worm 
"Somebody's Watching Me" by Rockwell
Splash and Bachelor Party (both starring Tom Hanks)
Gremlins
The Burning Bed
Tina Turner
Stirrup pants
Billy Idol
Revenge of the Nerds

Break Up Songs of 1984: "Sister Christian" by Night Ranger, "Hard Habit to Break" by Chicago and "Oh Sherrie" by Steve Perry

Donal Logue's Unfinished Thoughts on Scratch and Sniff

Hip-Hop Jam of 1984: "Roxanne, Roxanne" by UTFO

PSA of 1984: McGruff the Crime Dog's "Take A Bite Out of Crime" (subject: getting into cars with strangers)

Nerds of 1984: Ed Grimley, Alex Trebek and Long Duk Dong

The What The F#?%!!! Moment of 1984: President Ronald Reagan makes an off-the-record joke about outlawing and bombing Russia

1985
Lifestyles of the Rich and Famous
Rambo: First Blood Part II
Crack epidemic
"You Spin Me Round (Like a Record)" by Dead or Alive
Teen Wolf
Inspector Gadget 
Remington Steele 
"Rock Me Amadeus" by Falco
Jenga
Tears for Fears
Bobby Knight's explosive temper and getting ejected from the game vs. Purdue
The People's Court 
"That's What Friends Are For" by Dionne Warwick, Elton John, Gladys Knight and Stevie Wonder
227
North and South
"I Want to Know What Love Is" by Foreigner
Mr. Belvedere
New Coke
Jem
Weird Science

Donal Logue's Unfinished Thoughts on Crack Cocaine

Break Up Songs of 1985: "Broken Wings" by Mr. Mister, "I Miss You" by Klymaxx and "Don't You (Forget About Me)" by Simple Minds

Hip-Hop Jam of 1985: "The Show" by Doug E. Fresh

PSA of 1985: Bob Barker about AIDS (debunking the misconception of getting AIDS from cats)

Nerds of 1985: Crispin Glover, Lukas Haas and Larry King

The What The F#?%!!! Moment of 1985:  The "mythical unicorns" from Ringling Bros. and Barnum & Bailey Circus are actually goats with surgically fused horns

1986
 Pee-wee's Playhouse
 Jolt Cola 
 Bon Jovi's Slippery When Wet album
 LA Gear 
 "You Can Call Me Al" by Paul Simon
 Soul Man
 Rainbow Brite 
 "Walk Like an Egyptian" by The Bangles
 Dallas episode "Bobby Ewing Comes Back to Life"
 Howard the Duck
 About Last Night...
 The Mystery of Al Capone's Vault
 Ocean Pacific 
 "Conga" by Gloria Estefan
 L.A. Law
 The Golden Child
 Double Dare
 Garbage Pail Kids 
 Michael Jordan
 "Heartbeat" by Don Johnson
 Joe Isuzu
 The Fly

Donal Logue's Unfinished Thoughts on Bon Jovi

Break Up Songs of 1986: "No One Is to Blame" by Howard Jones, "Don't Dream It's Over" by Crowded House and "If You Leave" by Orchestral Manoeuvres in the Dark

Hip-Hop Jam of 1986: "Walk This Way" by Run-D.M.C. and Aerosmith

PSA of 1986: Rock Against Drugs (Aimee Mann of 'Til Tuesday)

Nerds of 1986: Willie Tanner, Rick Moranis and Cliff Clavin

The What The F#?%!!! Moment of 1986: Fred Grandy (who played "Gopher" on The Love Boat) runs for Congress in Iowa and wins

1987
Beauty and the Beast
"Here I Go Again" by Whitesnake
Scruples 
The Fat Boys
Flowers in the Attic
LL Cool J
Macho Movies (specifically Predator, RoboCop, and Over the Top)
Doc Martens
"Bad" by Michael Jackson
Full House
Less than Zero
Jody Watley
Remote Control
Biker shorts (Lycra)
Thundercats 
Raising Arizona
"Luka" by Suzanne Vega
A Different World
"Land of Confusion"  by Genesis
Steve Guttenberg
The Princess Bride

Donal Logue's Unfinished Thoughts on Scruples

Break Up Songs of 1987: "With or Without You" by U2, "Didn't We Almost Have It All" by Whitney Houston and "I Won't Forget You" by Poison

Hip-Hop Jam of 1987: "Push It" by Salt-n-Pepa & Spinderella

PSA of 1987: Rock Against Drugs (Anti-Drug)

Nerds of 1987: Revenge of the Nerds II: Nerds in Paradise, Bud Bundy and Gilbert Gottfried

The What The F#?%!!! Moment of 1987: Vanna White's autobiography book, Vanna Speaks, becomes a best-seller hit

1988
Big
Growing Pains 
MTV's Headbangers Ball
Ripped jeans
Beetlejuice
Who Framed Roger Rabbit
"Get Outta My Dreams, Get Into My Car" by Billy Ocean
Jamaica national bobsled team
My Two Dads
Garfield stuffed animals
Beaches
Charles in Charge 
A Fish Called Wanda
Ickey Woods (The "Ickey Shuffle") and the Bash Brothers (Jose Canseco and Mark McGwire)
Hypercolor T-shirts
"Pour Some Sugar On Me" by Def Leppard
Young Guns
Alternative rock (specifically R.E.M., Jane's Addiction, and Sonic Youth)
Vice President George H. W. Bush elected President of the United States
Chia Pet 
Tracy Chapman
Coming to America

Break Up Songs of 1988: "Every Rose Has Its Thorn" by Poison, "Don't Know What You Got (Till It's Gone)" by Cinderella and "Look Away" by Chicago

Donal Logue's Unfinished Thoughts on Garfield

Hip-Hop Jam of 1988: "Mary, Mary" by Run-D.M.C.

PSA of 1988: Sylvester Stallone for Give The Gift Of Literacy

Nerds of 1988: Mike Mills, Paul Pfeiffer and Miles Silverberg

The What The F#?%!!! Moment of 1988: The final episode of St. Elsewhere reveals that the entire series has taken place inside the autistic child's mind

1989
Weekend at Bernie's
Doogie Howser M.D.
"I Wanna Have Some Fun" by Samantha Fox
The Clapper
Field of Dreams
Pete Rose
"Just a Friend" by Biz Markie
Thirtysomething 
Yuppie
Richard Marx
Driving Miss Daisy
Zsa Zsa Gabor slaps a cop
"Patience" by Guns N' Roses
Rock N Roll Flowers (sound detection dancing flowers)
Beastie Boys' Paul's Boutique album
Bo Jackson
Designing Women
York Peppermint Pattie
House of Style
Choose Your Own Adventure books 
When Harry Met Sally...

Break Up Songs of 1989: "How Am I Supposed to Live Without You" by Michael Bolton, "Miss You Much" by Janet Jackson and "Free Fallin'" by Tom Petty

Donal Logue's Unfinished Thoughts on Pete Rose

Hip-Hop Jam of 1989: "Don't Believe the Hype" by Public Enemy

PSA of 1989: Magic Johnson on Designated Drivers

Nerds of 1989: Samuel "Screech" Powers, Woody Allen and Steve Urkel

The What The F#?%!!! Moment of 1989: 87-year-old Carrie Stringfellow nearly gets embalmed at a Springfield, Ohio funeral home

References

External links
 
 I Love the 80's Strikes Back on Internet Archive

Nostalgia television shows
Nostalgia television in the United States
VH1 original programming
2000s American television miniseries
2003 American television series debuts
2003 American television series endings